Renuka Kesaramadu is a contemporary painter and sculptor from India. She is best known internationally through her collaborative art exhibitions and participations in workshops in Europe. She has also curated a few international art symposia and exhibitions in India.

Education and career 
Renuka was born in 1957 in the village of Kesaramadu, whence her last name was adopted, near the city of Tumakuru in Tumakuru district in the Indian state Karnataka.

She holds a Master of Fine Arts (MFA) in Art History from Karnataka Chitrakala Parishath – Bengaluru, Master of Arts (MA) in History from Annamalai University – Chennai and a Bachelor of Science (BSc) from Bangalore University. She also obtained a Government Diploma (GD) in Painting with 1st Rank for 5 years and Gold Medal from the Ken School of Art – Bengaluru under the instruction of the legendary artist R M Hadapad.

She served as a member of the Karnataka Lalit Kala Academy (KLA) in Bangalore, and as a fine art lecturer.

Awards and honors
Renuka is a recipient of several awards at national art competitions in India and numerous local awards for her art, along with a few awards for her service.
 All India Art Competition by Karnataka Chitrakala Parishath, Bengaluru in 1993
 All India Art Competition by Bharatiya Shikshan Mandal, Mumbai in 1987, 1988 and in 1989
 All India Art Competition at Mysore Dasara in 1992
 All India Art Competition at Bijapur in 2009
 Best Teacher Award at Tumakuru in 1994
 Kannada Rajyotsava Award at Tumakuru in 1993
 Rotary Award by the Rotary Club at Tumakuru in 1999

Solo exhibitions 
Renuka's works have been exhibited in several solo art shows in Finland, Romania and India.

In Finland, Galleries such as Magazine Gallery in Hovinkartano, Hauho, Taidegalleria Ripustus in Hämeenlinna and Caisa International Cultural Center in Helsinki have exhibited her paintings, along with Galeria Frunzetti in Bacău, Romania.

In India, galleries hosting her solo exhibitions have included Lalit Kala Academy in Goa, Bajaj Art Gallery in Mumbai, Lalit Kala Akademi in Chennai, Kalpa Kuncha Art Gallery in Tumkur and Chamarajendra Academy of Visual Arts in Mysore, along with Karnataka Chitrakala Parishath, Alliance Française de Bangalore and Venkatappa Art Gallery in Bangalore.

Group exhibitions 
Renuka has been a part of many group exhibitions in Europe, India and several countries elsewhere.

Internationally, her paintings have been part of group exhibitions in Naples, Milan, Turin, Corsico, Vercelli, Scampia and Rovereto in Italy. In Finland, her works have been exhibited in Kangasala, Renko, Hovinkartano, Hämeenlinna and Seinäjoki. Other exhibitions with her works outside India include those in Jakarta (Indonesia), New York City (United States), Slovakia, São Paulo (Brazil), Santiago (Spain) and Ghana (West Africa).

In India, she has been part of group shows at Karnataka Chitrakala Parishath, Art Houz, Srusti Art Gallery, Bangalore Art Gallery, Lakshana Art Gallery and National Gallery of Modern Art in Bangalore. She has exhibited at Gufa Art Gallery, Rajpath Club golden hall, Art Chalet, Contemporary Art Gallery and Marvel Art Gallery in Ahmedabad. Her other group exhibitions have included those at Values Gallery and Lalit Kala Academy in Chennai, Artist Center, Nehru Art Center and Museum Gallery in Mumbai, Art Mall in New Delhi, Sristi Art Gallery in Hyderabad, and one in Bijapur.

Her works have been selected for participation in several competitions, including those by Karnataka Lalit Kala Academy, Karnataka Shilpa Kala Academy, All India Art Competition at Karnataka Chitrakala Parishat, 'Prints Today' by Karnataka Lalit Kala Academy, one by All India Fine Arts and Crafts Society – New Delhi, and one by Camlin Art Foundation, in Bangalore. Other selected participations have included All India Exhibition at Mysore Dasara, one by South Central Zone Cultural Centre at Nagpur, All India Competition at Bijapur and Bikuram Jain Competition at New Delhi.

She has also organized several group art exhibitions in India, including:
 'Dialogue of Identities – 2016', an international women's group show at Karnataka Chitrakala Parishath, Bangalore
 An exhibition by Karnataka artists at Gallery-1, Karnataka Chitrakala Parishath, Bangalore
 'Dialogue of Identities', an international women's show at Jehangir Art Gallery, Mumbai
 'IX', an international women's group show at Abstract Art Gallery, Bangalore
 'We Four', a women's group show at Renaissance Art Gallery, Bangalore
 'East West Women', Time and Space Art Gallery, Bangalore

Art symposia 
Renuka has participated in several international art symposia including those at Hämeenlinna in Finland, at Scampia and Sormano in Italy, and at Ideal Fine Arts Institute and SGVM in Gulbarga, India. She has also organized 'Centu-Rays', an international art symposium at Siddaganga Institute of Technology commemorating the birth centenary of Sri Shivakumara Swamiji at Tumakuru in India.

Her participations in India also include national camps at Mangalore, Mysore and Bijapur, and state camps at Bangalore, Tumkur, Bilagi, Bidar, Doddaballapur, Ramanagar and Mysore.

Reviews 
"Renuka Kesaramadu has created a series of works in which the reality of the country of Sormano and its atmosphere are depicted carefully. Take shape on her canvases do the cobbled paths, the profiles of the mountains, the houses, the church, the beautiful young women who accompanied the artist showing and explaining, in English of course, aspects and particularities of the country. A country that, despite the dominance of gray, has its aspects of preciousness that the artist emphasizes through the use of the color gold. The same country that, in one of her works, is dotted with gold and wrapped in a loved symbology of white flowers, made using crumpled tissue paper and glued on the canvas." [Translation]- Antonella Prota Giurleo, 9 August 2009, Sormano, Italy"Modernist sources: The four mid-generation painters recently at Renaissance [Gallery] are preoccupied with different subjects whose graceful but conventional range corresponds to their somewhat old-fashioned aesthetic languages, and binds them. This perhaps can be associated with the artists’ roots in Karnataka’s provincial educational institutions. To varying degrees and in varying ways, all of them relay on the indigenized, Modernism-derived combination of abstract elements, stylized figures and patterned design. These ingredients are softer and more abstract in Renuka Kesaramadu's dynamic evocations of human hands reaching out over distances of the globe..."- Marta Jakimowicz, art critic and writer, Deccan Herald Online, 9 August 2009, Bangalore, India"The eye theme has been successfully exploited by a Karnataka artist, Renuka Kesaramadu. It is the eye that sees, understands, starts off communication, determines human relations."- Arkay, at the Bajaj Art Gallery, 1997, Mumbai, India"Two pieces from '92 show the artist's experimentation with brushwork. 'Travelers I' depicts figures bathing, and is done with the sinuous motion and thick outline common to Edvard Munch, where each stroke follows the contour of the figure. A figure on the right foreground, her back to the viewer and arms upraised, strongly resembles one of Munch's 'Bathers' though the palette – pinks and greens – reminds one of Monet and the foreground composition is similar to Botticelli's 'Venus'. 'Travelers II' is done in equally energetic strokes though rather than undulating curves the artist has used short straight motions. Despite the use of flowing lines in 'Travelers I', 'Travelers II', with its strong diagonals, has more of a sense of motion. Her brushwork captures the sense of activity and the anticipation of the passengers waiting for a train in a busy station. This work is a bit more sophisticated than some of her other paintings; the diagonal composition is restrained enough not to be obvious, and her use of increasingly intense hues effectively shows projection into space."- Catherine E. Cooney, at Venkatappa Art Gallery, 1995, Bangalore, India

Personal life 
Renuka Kesaramadu lives in Tumakuru in India, while her works are commissioned through art galleries in Bengaluru. Her husband B S Mallikarjuna is a musician and theater actor in the Indian language Kannada.

See also 
 Tumakuru
 List of people from Karnataka
 Art and culture of Karnataka

References

External links 

 Renuka Kesaramadu's personal website
 Renuka Kesaramadu's artist page on facebook
 Renuka Kesaramadu's gallery on ArtSlant.com
 Renuka Kesaramadu's gallery on ArtFlute.com

Bangalore University alumni
Indian women contemporary artists
Indian contemporary painters
Indian women painters
Indian women sculptors
People from Tumkur district
Artists from Karnataka
20th-century Indian painters
20th-century Indian women artists
1957 births
Living people
20th-century Indian sculptors
21st-century Indian sculptors
21st-century Indian painters
21st-century Indian women artists
Women artists from Karnataka
Indian contemporary sculptors
Painters from Karnataka